Basantapur is a Village Development Committee in Baitadi District in Sudurpashchim Province of western Nepal. At the time of the 1991 Nepal census it had a population of 2,141 and had 366 houses in the village.

This village is very nice, and people there are very helpful. Many of the people from this village are settled in metro cities of India and in the large cities of the Nepal. Many of the people are settled in Delhi; some of them are businessmen, and a number of youngsters have joined the army in Nepal and are serving their nation. Those who are away from their village they come once in a year and see their native village. Many NGO's are working for the village. The village has its own high school and is having water supply to almost every house. Many festivals like "Gaura", "Dashain" (etc.) are celebrated round the year. The main earning of the people comes from agriculture. The village has many mills (ghatta in Nepal) for the grinding of wheat. The public transport system is not connected to it, but maybe in the coming years, there will be a transport system of the village.

References

Populated places in Baitadi District